Freak Orlando is a 1981 West German comedy film directed by Ulrike Ottinger and starring Magdalena Montezuma.

Cast
 Magdalena Montezuma – Orlando, als Pilger, Orlando Zyldopa, Orlando Orlanda, Orlando Capricho
 Hans Langerschlanger – Muntzy Pimplips
 Delphine Seyrig – Helena Müller, als Lebensbaumgöttin, Kaufhausonsängerin, Mutter der Wundergeburt
 Albert Heins – Herbert Zeus
 Claudio Pantoja – Zwei Tänzer
 Hiro Uchiyama – Zwei Tänzer (as Hiro Uschiyama)
 Galli – Chronistin
 Eddie Constantine – Säulenheiliger
 Else Nabu – Heilige Wilgeforte
 Maria Bucholt – Kleine Menschen
 Paul Glauer – Kleine Menschen
 Alfred Raupach – Kleine Menschen
 Luzig Raupach – Kleine Menschen
 Monika Ullemeyer – Kleine Menschen (as Monika Ullemayer)
 Dirk Zalm – Kleine Menschen
 Luc Alexander – Zwolf Lederboys

References

External links

1981 films
1981 comedy films
West German films
1980s German-language films
1980s avant-garde and experimental films
German avant-garde and experimental films
Films directed by Ulrike Ottinger
1980s German films